Frank Kleber (born 11 February 1981 in Gräfelfing) is a German skeleton racer who has competed since 2000. He won two medals at the FIBT World Championships with a gold in 2007 (Mixed team) and a bronze in 2004 (Men's skeleton).

Kleber also finished 11th in the men's skeleton event at the 2002 Winter Olympics in Salt Lake City.

His best overall seasonal Skeleton World Cup finish was third in the men's event in 2003–4.

References
 2002 men's skeleton results
 BSD profile 
 FIBT profile
 List of men's skeleton World Cup champions since 1987.
 Men's skeleton world championship medalists since 1989
 Mixed bobsleigh-skeleton world championship medalists since 2007
 Official website  
 Skeletonsport.com profile

External links
 

1981 births
Living people
German male skeleton racers
Skeleton racers at the 2002 Winter Olympics
Olympic skeleton racers of Germany
20th-century German people
21st-century German people